is a village located in Nagano Prefecture, Japan. , the village had an estimated population of 3,748 in 1275 households, and a population density of 98 persons per km2. The percentage of the population over 65 years old was 33.78%.

Geography
Shimojō is located mountainous southern Nagano Prefecture.

Surrounding municipalities
 Nagano Prefecture
 Iida
 Anan
 Achi
 Yasuoka

Climate
The town has a climate characterized by hot and humid summers, and cold winters (Köppen climate classification Cfa).  The average annual temperature in Shimojō is 12.6 °C. The average annual rainfall is 1857 mm with September as the wettest month. The temperatures are highest on average in August, at around 24.6 °C, and lowest in January, at around -0.8 °C.

Demographics
Per Japanese census data, the population of Shimojō has seen some success in reversing decades of decline. The village of Shimojō has defied the declining birthrate noted in Japan as well increasing capital revenue by increasing worker efficiency. In 2003–2005, the village birthrate, "was 2.12...against the national average of 1.25 in 2005" while, "...personal expenses were cut by ¥450 million". Reforms have thus allowed the village to grow without government subsidies due to its sufficient capital which has allowed the village, as village head Ito Kihei remarks, to offer, "places to enjoy...such facilities as a mobile library, a swimming pool and a culture hall [while] enriching the child-raising environment and assistance by making medical expenses free for children through junior high school."

History
The area of present-day Shimojō was part of ancient Shinano Province. The village of Shimojō was established on April 1, 1889 with the establishment of the modern municipalities system.

Economy
The economy of Shimojō is primarily agricultural. Principal crops include buckwheat, pears, apples and dried persimmons.

Education
Shimojō has one public elementary school and one public middle school operated by the village government. The village does not have a high school.

Transportation

Railway
The village does not have any passenger railway service

Highway

References

External links

Official Website 

 
Villages in Nagano Prefecture